LNR may refer to:

 Aeronca L-3, a World War II aircraft also known by the designation LNR
 Ligue nationale de rugby, the organization that operates the two professional rugby union leagues in France
 Local nature reserve, a type of nature reserve in the UK
 Ellen Henrietta Ranyard (1810–1879), an English writer who wrote as "LNR"
 Lao National Radio, the national radio station for Laos
 Leeds Northern Railway, a 19th-century British railway company
 Tri-County Regional Airport, Wisconsin, U.S., IATA airport code LNR
 Llanwrda railway station, Wales, station code LNR
 London Northwestern Railway, part of British train operating company West Midlands Trains
 Luhansk People's Republic (Luhanska Narodna Respublika), former self-proclaimed quasi-state in Ukraine (2014-2022)
 Lugansk People's Republic, a de facto federal subject of Russia